WTIF (1340 kHz) is an AM radio station licensed to Tifton, Georgia, United States. The station is currently owned by Danny Sterling, through licensee Sterling Southern Land, LLC.

WTIF had been airing a classic country format. On July 6, 2022, WTIF ceased operations.

F.M. translator
WTIF was rebroadcast on F.M. translator station W260AT on 99.9 MHz.

References

External links

TIF
Radio stations established in 1974